Lakelands, Nova Scotia may refer to one of two places
Lakelands in Cumberland County
Lakelands in Hants County